In algebraic geometry and algebraic topology, branches of mathematics,  homotopy theory or motivic homotopy theory is a way to apply the techniques of algebraic topology, specifically homotopy, to algebraic varieties and, more generally, to schemes.  The theory is due to Fabien Morel and Vladimir Voevodsky.  The underlying idea is that it should be possible to develop a purely algebraic approach to homotopy theory by replacing the unit interval , which is not an algebraic variety, with the affine line , which is.  The theory has seen spectacular applications such as Voevodsky's construction of the derived category of mixed motives and the proof of the Milnor and Bloch-Kato conjectures.

Construction
 homotopy theory is founded on a category called the  homotopy category . Simply put, the  homotopy category, or rather the canonical functor , is the universal functor from the category  of smooth -schemes towards an infinity category which satisfies Nisnevich descent, such that the affine line  becomes contractible. Here  is some prechosen base scheme (e.g., the spectrum of the complex numbers ).

This definition in terms of a universal property is not possible without infinity categories. These were not available in the 90's and the original definition passes by way of Quillen's theory of model categories. Another way of seeing the situation is that Morel-Voevodsky's original definition produces a concrete model for (the homotopy category of) the infinity category .

This more concrete construction is sketched below.

Step 0
Choose a base scheme . Classically,  is asked to be Noetherian, but many modern authors such as Marc Hoyois work with quasi-compact quasi-separated base schemes. In any case, many important results are only known over a perfect base field, such as the complex numbers, it's perfectly fine to consider only this case.

Step 1
Step 1a: Nisnevich sheaves. Heuristically, this should be considered as (and in a precise technical sense is) the universal enlargement of  obtained by adjoining all colimits and forcing Nisnevich descent to be satisfied.

Step 1b: simplicial sheaves. In order to more easily perform standard homotopy theoretic procedures such as homotopy colimits and homotopy limits,  replaced with the following category of simplicial sheaves.

Let  be the simplex category, that is, the category whose objects are the sets

and whose morphisms are order-preserving functions. We let  denote the category of functors .

Step 1c: fibre functors. Explicitly,  where the colimit is over factorisations  of the canonical inclusion  via an étale morphism .

Step 1d: the closed model structure. Let  be a morphism of simplicial sheaves. We say that:
  is a cofibration if it is a monomorphism.
  is a fibration if it has the right lifting property with respect to any cofibration which is a weak equivalence.

The homotopy category of this model structure is denoted .

Step 2
This model structure has Nisnevich descent, but it does not contract the affine line. A simplicial sheaf  is called -local if for any simplicial sheaf  the map

Here we are considering  as a sheaf via the Yoneda embedding, and the constant simplicial object functor .

A morphism  is an -weak equivalence if for any -local , the induced map

is a bijection. The -local model structure is the localisation of the above model with respect to -weak equivalences.

Formal Definition
Finally we may define the  homotopy category.

Definition. Equip  with the Nisnevich topology to get the site . It is denoted . Similarly, for the pointed simplicial sheaves  there is an associated pointed homotopy category .

in the homotopy category.

Properties of the theory

Wedge and smash products of simplicial (pre)sheaves 
Because we started with a simplicial model category to construct the -homotopy category, there are a number of structures inherited from the abstract theory of simplicial models categories. In particular, for  pointed simplicial sheaves in  we can form the wedge product as the colimitand the smash product is defined asrecovering some of the classical constructions in homotopy theory. There is in addition a cone of a simplicial (pre)sheaf and a cone of a morphism, but defining these requires the definition of the simplicial spheres.

Simplicial spheres 
In the pointed homotopy category there is additionally the suspension functor given by and its right adjointcalled the loop space functor.

Remarks 
The setup, especially the Nisnevich topology, is chosen as to make algebraic K-theory representable by a spectrum, and in some aspects to make a proof of the Bloch-Kato conjecture possible.

After the Morel-Voevodsky construction there have been several different approaches to  homotopy theory by using other model category structures or by using other sheaves than Nisnevich sheaves (for example, Zariski sheaves or just all presheaves). Each of these constructions yields the same homotopy category.

There are two kinds of spheres in the theory: those coming from the multiplicative group playing the role of the -sphere in topology, and those coming from the simplicial sphere (considered as constant simplicial sheaf). This leads to a theory of motivic spheres  with two indices. To compute the homotopy groups of motivic spheres would also yield the classical stable homotopy groups of the spheres, so in this respect  homotopy theory is at least as complicated as classical homotopy theory.

Motivic analogies

Eilenberg-Maclane spaces 
For an abelian group  the -motivic cohomology of a smooth scheme  is given by the sheaf hypercohomology groupsfor . Then, for a smooth scheme  we have the equivalenceshowing these sheaves represent motivic Eilenberg-Maclane spacespg 3.

The stable homotopy category

A further construction in A1-homotopy theory is the category SH(S), which is obtained from the above unstable category by forcing the smash product with Gm to become invertible. This process can be carried out either using model-categorical constructions using so-called Gm-spectra or alternatively using infinity-categories.

For S = Spec (R), the spectrum of the field of real numbers, there is a functor

to the stable homotopy category from algebraic topology. The functor is characterized by sending a smooth scheme X / R to the real manifold associated to X. This functor has the property that it sends the map

to an equivalence, since  is homotopy equivalent to a two-point set.  has shown that the resulting functor

is an equivalence.

References

Survey articles and lectures
 Morel (2002) An Introduction to A1-homotopy theory

Motivic homotopy

Foundations 
 Motivic stable homotopy groups
 

 Voevodsky, Vladimir (2008) "Unstable motivic homotopy categories in Nisnevich and cdh-topologies"

Motivic Steenrod algebra 

 Voevodsky, Vladimir (2001) "Reduced power operations in motivic cohomology"
 Voevodsky, Vladimir (2008) "Motivic Eilenberg-Maclane spaces"

Motivic adams spectral sequence 

 The motivic Adams spectral sequence
 Motivic chromatic homotopy theory

Spectra 

 Jardine. (1999) Motivic Symmetric Spectra

Bloch-Kato 

 The Gersten conjecture for Milnor K-theory
 Tate twists and cohomology of P1

Applications 

The motivic Steenrod algebra in positive characteristic
Motivic stable homotopy groups
On the Motivic  of the Sphere Spectrum (Springer)
The first stable homotopy groups of the motivic sphere
On the zero slice of the sphere spectrum
Vanishing in stable motivic homotopy sheaves

References

 

Algebraic geometry
Homotopy theory